3, Triq ix-Xatt was a nineteenth-century building in Marsaskala, Malta. Built during the Crown Colony of Malta, it was a vernacular structure which appears in an iconic 1885 photo of the former fishing village - prior development into a residential and holiday location. It was among the few old buildings in the area at one time, which at some point became a residence until it became vacant.

Being at one side in a development zone and on another side in a conservation area made the latter irrelevant, according to some Planning Authority (PA) regulations. It thus became subjected to demolition and re-development, and the Superintendence for Cultural Property found no objection by claiming that it has vernacular characteristics with no detailed design.

The initial observation and decisions taken by the PA and the Superintendence have received waves of criticism to demolish the building, to replace it with another double purpose building - with NGOs, the local council, residents and interesting parties reaching out information and file opposition to proceed with the proposed development. The building was demolished gradually in 2018.

Background

The location where the building existed until 2018 was originally a fishing village but gradually developed into a crowded building zone, as a holiday destination for locals and foreigners as well as permanent residence to others. It was inhabited since pre-history and was a Roman port in antiquity. Throughout Maltese history Marsaskala was prone to barbary attacks from the sea and was not safe to live and prosper. The nearby then villages, and later cities, of Żejtun and Żabbar were subject to similar landings from sea.

Buildings erected in the area and in the immediate vicinity were generally fortified. A number of coastal defence structures were built in different centuries. Thus there was minimum interest to develop a community until well in the 19th century, with the exception of few farmhouses, when the course of events and situation in the Mediterranean Sea has changed drastically.

History

Context

According to Louis de Boisgelin (historian of the Order of St John), in 1805 there was nothing notable as for urban development in Marsaskala, apart from the port which was evidently used as a harbour. By 10 March 1854, fishing in the zone required permission with respect to certain conditions. Since the 1950s, electricity also became available for private property at the request of the owners. In 1969 it was observed that there was the first building boom in the area. By the 1970s, sewage system was installed for most of the buildings of Marsaskala.

The surrounding land remained mostly arable with traditional terraced fields at the backdrop of the summer residences until the 20th century, when permissions was granted to build apartment dwellings. People from the Cottonera had built a number of summer residences in Marsaskala, also because in the 19th century the area was under the parish of Senglea. Marsaskala became a vice-parish of Żabbar by the early 20th century. Another part of Marsaskala was part of Żejtun.

In the 20th century, the area where the building stands saw a massive transformation. A government census taken on 26 April 1931 found a good number of habitable houses of the time were vacant throughout the year. During WWII the few residents of the village were evacuated, leaving only the presence of the British military. On 19 March 1949, Marsaskala was declared a parish of its own, when the villagers did not just return but there was also an increase in population. In 1963 it was noted that most houses in Marsaskala were next to the sea, with the main reason being to enjoy the breeze in warm weather.

The town experienced another significant change in 1982, from a rural and fishing village to a major tourist destination, in which period was experiencing a “Villscape in transition”. the Jerma Palace Hotel was opened in the locality which led to a consequentialism further development; this has resulted in the change of use of the area, and sea activity took a minor role since the 1980s. The hotel closed down in 2007 and other alternatives were sought by the Marsaskala Local Council to regenerate the area. The Council has noted that cultural heritage was the prime reason for foreigners to visit the area but at the same time it was not being preserved.

A number of building blocks, in the vicinity of Triq ix-Xatt and close to sea, were deemed an eyesore and unsustainable to the village in 2010. This and other formalized the question whether Marsaskala has adopted Bugibbisation, which happens when a large concentration of buildings overshadow the characteristics of a traditional Maltese village. Most traditional old houses in Marsaskala have been destroyed and replaced with economical accommodation for the growing demand of the population; this has led a rapid destruction of much of the heritage of Marsaskala, of which since the 21st century the urban area barely portrays what used to be a fishing village. A proposed regeneration for Marsaskala in 2008 supported the idea of a “Transit Village” with a hybrid transformation.

Area

The first group of houses in Marsaskala were constructed around the mid-19th century, during the Crown Colony of Malta, and some were built to be used for the primary sector such as fishing, but also for leisure. Other working activities involved farming and collecting salt from pans at the sea shore. The most prominent buildings were those next to the shore. Some of these houses were used almost only for summer. These houses were generally small with plenty of space in front and behind.

In the 1970s several British people lived in the proximity of the building and a road, Triq ix-Xatt, in front of the building was constructed partially by land reclamation to accommodate more access to traffic and pedestrians. At this point, the first wave of food stores and restaurants catered for the population who lived there and its visitors. Several of the early buildings in Triq ix-Xatt were not spared from modifications to accommodate restaurants, cafeterias and take-aways. At this point, a natural sandy beach in Triq ix-Xatt was lost forever as it has become too spoilt to dare to swim. Some of the cultural buildings in Triq ix-Xatt were demolished or partially demolished for similar reasons, as this made well for greater income to the developers.

In the 1990s, the remaining empty land on one side of the building was developed with the erection of the Brighton Hotel. The place became much frequented because of the Brighton Pizzeria; this also has since made an impact in the whereabouts of the building because of the litter the clients left. Some of the traditional houses in the street were demolished and replaced by modern buildings, described as being mediocre in terms of architecture and aesthetic design.

Building

The building at 3, Triq ix-Xatt (Marina Street), Marsaskala, was located between the front of scheduled Villa Apap Bologna with its adjoint chapel and the main promenade of the village. It was built sometimes in the 19th century but its exact date and other details are unknown. The Planning Authority was requested by the Local Council and others to make a study about the details of the building but these were not carried out. It is established that the building appeared on site since the earliest and all photos know of the site. The first photo taken of the area, showing the building, is in a nostalgic photograph of 1885. It is generally described as of being vernacular architecture, meaning it may had no architect or general planning. The latter implies that it was built for convenience to the owners for specific purpose close to the sea. It is known to have been one of the few early sea-side houses. It has been described as one of the oldest residential properties in Marsaskala. It was entirely located within the Urban Conservation Area (UCA). It originally had wooden apertures and a prominent balcony looking towards the sea.

Until more buildings became on demand and some roads were required to be constructed, patrons of summer houses freely walked from their doorsteps on natural coast formation to the sea for a swim.

In the late 2010s the residence was sold and left vacant by the new patron. The building was left to dilapidate and without maintenance, but remained intact.

A document of the Planning Authority, dated July 2006, includes the site in the Entertainment Priority Area.  The Local Council installed rustic designed electric lamps in 2010 in the centre of the village, and this included one lamp attached on the building as it is in the immediate vicinity. The lamps were noted by the Planning Authority in 2016.

The site is detached from other building, with four streets surrounding it. The four streets are Triq ix-Xatt, It-Tieni Trejqa, Triq Sant’ Anna and It-Tielet Trejqa. Having four corners, it had the sight of two principals roads from two balconies, with one wide balcony at the front and a smaller one at the back. It had a number of apertures, some of which were walled up over the years, with the remaining apertures having modern black aluminum frames, which replaced other apertures. Similar to other early buildings, it had a wide front terrace, looking towards the sea, where the main entrance stood.

The 19th-century building was originally part of number of old buildings within the Conservation Area of Marsaskala. The building was adequate to be embellished for different use, including a restaurant. The building is found in an area of high economic income for development, at the seaside of Marsaskala where a chain of restaurants operate. It thus had become profitable to develop the site. Even if so, the decision was regretted by conservationists and locals as this led to the loss of another vernacular structure.

Application

Architect
The Planning Authority has received an application (PA/02240/17) from Architect Christopher “Chris” Mintoff, on behalf of developer Michael Stivala, for the complete demolition of the building at 3, Triq ix-Xatt, and to be replaced by another higher structure. The new building is proposed to cater for a restaurant, with a residence on the top floors having a separate entrance.

At the time of the application, Mintoff was the President of the Chamber of Architects of Malta. He has criticised the Planning Authority for its weak and nonsense policies over its development decisions, saying it goes as far as issuing permits against building regulations and having its functioning operating in a “bureaucratic mess”. As of 2019 Mintoff is no longer the President of the Chamber of Architects, and has continued to constructively criticise demolition and development policies.

Developer
The developer, Michael Stivala, is the chairperson of Stivala Group. He is also the General-Secretariat of the Malta Developers’ Association (MDA), and simultaneously a member of the council of the Malta Hotels and Restaurants Association (MHRA). He is known for his lobbying for further construction, with the Government of Malta and the Planning Authority. Stivala is a construction and hospitality co-developer with his other family members. One of the branches of his shared ST Group company is the ST Properties Ltd which focuses on mixed-use development. The group claims to invest in economical sustainable development which yields good income. Stivala (August 2018) has criticised environmentalists and supportive politicians for their agenda against overdevelopment, and in response to this John Consiglio (August 2018) has rebutted him by saying that he is a main contributor for the “Uglification of Malta”.

Planning Authority

As per law, the application was sent by an Architect, Christopher Mintoff, on behalf of Stivala, and it was received on October 4, 2016. The application was left pending while studies were underway and was considered as a valid application on March 27, 2017. During this time, the case officer inspects the place, sets meetings with the Arhcitect and Developer, and informs about the results to pertinent authorities.

It has been observed that the site falls within the Urban Conservation Area (UCA) and within the Development Zone. A decision had to be taken before July 21, 2017, as a target date by the Case Officer Roderick Livori, who has a Bachelor degree in Geography. The proposed application was first published in the Malta Government Gazette on April 2, 2017, as a Legal Notice requirement, and appeals could be received until May 12, 2017. The same Legal Notice was attached to the main façade of the building.

Livori presented a draft report to Robert Vella, who on June 1 decided to endorse it. The report was discussed with the commission or board during the agenda which took place in the same month on the 21st, which made the decision to grant the permission on the same day. Another notice, non-executive, was available on July 20, 2017, and a final decision was taken in the same month on the 26th, with a decisive post on September 27, 2017. The application was approved and works were given the go ahead from March 5, 2018.

It is common for the Planning Authority to give permission for demolition when the bad practice of using cement, that makes the building deteriorates, takes place. This is a common option for developers in Malta to take for justifying demolition.

Superintendence

On 21 June 2017, it was revealed that the Superintendence for Cultural Heritage (SCH) has not opposed the complete demolition and development. The Superintendent Anthony Pace did not consider the building of having any heritage value, and this gave way for its demolition.

Even so, opposition by the SCH is irrelevant as the 2016 Development and Planning Act allows the Planning Authority to ignore recommendations by the SCH. This act, to ignore the SCH, has been used from the beginning of its creation. Other vernacular building, even of architectural and historic value, have been destroyed by permission of the Planning Authority. In March 2018 it was announced, by Minister Owen Bonnici (Ministry for Justice, Culture and Local Government), that Pace will be terminating his position as a superintendent and the vacant role to be filled by Joe Magro Conti.

Reactions

Marsaskala Local Council
In 2017, the Local Council has described the building of being a local and national heritage, irrelevant of the decision, and recommended the Planning Authority to review its decision. The Council commented:

The Local Council has filed to appeal of the proposal in June 2018, and on that day it planned to urgently meet on May 18, 2018.

The Council initially opposed any change to the historic building, irrelevant to its condition. The Councillor said that the Architect of the developer has misguided the Local Council by purposely allowing the prescription date for appeal of development to pass.

The Local Council has discussed the application during a meeting when the public was able to attend and everything was broadcast live on the internet. The Local Council was surprised with the decision of the Planning Authority case officer that gave the permission.

NGOs

Heritage NGOs, such as Din l-Art Ħelwa (National Trust of Malta) and Flimkien għal Ambjent Aħjar (Together for a Better Environment), have opposed the demolition of the building. The NGOs believe that vernacular buildings, whether in urban development or in rural environment, should be preserved as a main Maltese characteristic in architectural heritage which generally gives character to a given village. The NGOs observed that such buildings are being demolished by developers and replaced by non-contextual buildings with a building style not traditional to Maltese built environment. The NGOs believe that, if the developers are willing, such a building could be preserved and converted into a number of possibilities such as accommodation in hospitality services and catering. The NGOs fear that not enough is being done to preserve vernacular architecture and when such buildings are demolished it changes the typical area where the building stood. The NGOs believe that the building in Marsaskala has contributed to the architectural development of the village.

The executive president of Din l-Art Ħelwa, Maria Grazia Cassar, became a militant spokesperson against the demolition of vernacular buildings in rural and urban environment. She said that such buildings are pertinent to be retained. A meeting was set up by Din l-Art Ħelwa where the Prime Minister, Leader of the Opposition and other distinguished people were invited. The meeting took place right after the 2017 general election which was thought to be an ideal period to set mutual understandings. The NGO presented its views against the permissions lately given by the Planning Authority, but the response was a set-back for the organisation.

Flimkien għal Ambjent Aħjar requested an investigation into the granting of the permission.

Residents
People from Marsaskala opposed the demolition of the building, together with rejecting any replacement building, independent and irrelevant to the opinion of the superintendence. The main reason behind the objection by Marsaskala residents was to maintain the old building and restore it. Some official objections by individuals, numbering at least 18, were presented to the Planning Authority. Driven by the outrage of many other residents, the Marsaskala Local Council has shown opposition and supported similar views of the objectors.

Media
More people were informed through the media and social network.
On April 26, 2017, the Malta Today revealed the planning application proposal. Journalist James Debono of Malta Today had reported the proposal and remained following all pertinent steps about the building. On June 22, 2017, In-Nazzjon reported, on the front page, that the Planning Authority has approved the full application.

Political views
Back in 2005, then Councillor of Marsaskala Owen Bonnici (later Minister for Justice, Culture and Local Government) has criticized the Nationalist Government for any development which changes the remaining characteristics of the fishing village.

In May 2011, prior to the application, Carmel Cacopardo of Democratic Alternative has described Marsaskala as a “Concrete Jungle” saying that many houses have been replaced by unsympathetic buildings. According to public discussion online this happens because of political interventions that intervene to favour the developers with the entities responsible for building regulations.

The Superintendent, Pace, was harshly criticized for his passive role and laissez-faire (let it be) attitude as superintendent by the Democratic Party.

Decision

Demolition
The proposed development was approved, without modifications from the original planning.

Replacement
A modern contemporary building was approved by the Planning Authority with a visible modern twist. The ground floor will be ideal for a busy two-floors restaurant, and capable of adapting to catering needs. It will be one of a series of food and beverages places in Marsaskala.

The top floor will have its own entrance leading to a maisonette. The building will be higher than the older one, but not more than other buildings on the side. It will partially hide the landmark view of a scheduled villa at the back but the villa is considerably on an upper ground. The building height of the street and the old core, according to local planning, is supposedly two floors in Triq Sant Anna and three floors in Triq ix-Xatt. However, several buildings along the street have more floors, at a maximum of four floors, and this put a legal challenge for the authorities to allow similar permissions.

See also
 33, Cathedral Street
 Sea Malta Building
 The Green House, Sliema
 Villa St Ignatius

References

Bibliography

Books

Documents
Minutes
 
 
 
 
 
 

Reports

Journals
Academic
 
 

Gazettes
 

 

Magazines

News
 
Newspapers
 
 
 
 

 
 

Online news

Other
Websites
 
 
 
 
 
 
 
 
 
 
 
 
 

Dissertations

External links

19th-century establishments in Malta
Boathouses
Buildings and structures completed in the 19th century
Buildings and structures demolished in 2018
Controversies in Malta
Demolished buildings and structures in Malta
Limestone buildings in Malta
Buildings and structures in Marsaskala